There are 42 Grade I listed buildings in Maidstone. The Borough of Maidstone is a local government district in the English county of Kent. The district has a population of approximately 166,400 in 2016.

In the United Kingdom, the term listed building refers to a building or other structure officially designated as being of special architectural, historical or cultural significance; Grade I structures are those considered to be "buildings of exceptional interest". Listing was begun by a provision in the Town and Country Planning Act 1947. Once listed, severe restrictions are imposed on the modifications allowed to a building's structure or its fittings. In England, buildings are given listed building status by the Secretary of State for Culture, Media and Sport, acting on the recommendation of English Heritage.

More than half of the Grade I buildings in Maidstone are Norman- or medieval-era churches or church related buildings. The greatest concentration of Grade I listed buildings is in central Maidstone, where the Archbishop's Palace, Church of All Saints, the Tithe Barn and the College Gateway form a related group next to the River Medway. Non-religious buildings include Allington Castle and Leeds Castle and manor houses such as the 13th-century Nettlestead Place and 14th-century Otham Manor. Later domestic buildings include 15th-century Chilston Park and 16th-century Boughton Place, both at Boughton Malherbe. The most recent buildings included in the list are the 18th-century West Farleigh Hall and Linton Park.

Buildings

|}

See also
 Grade I listed buildings in Kent
 Grade II* listed buildings in Maidstone
 Scheduled monuments in Maidstone

Notes

References

External links

Maidstone
Lists of Grade I listed buildings in Kent
Borough of Maidstone